Once Upon a Time in the East can refer to:

 Once Upon a Time in the East (1974 film), a 1974 Canadian film
 Once Upon a Time in the East (2011 film), a 2011 Bulgarian film